Noordbeemster is a town in the Dutch province of North Holland. It is a part of the former municipality of Beemster, and lies about 9 km north of Purmerend. Since 2022 it has been part of the municipality of Purmerend.

The statistical district "Noordbeemster", which covers the village and the surrounding countryside, has a population of around 360.

References

Populated places in North Holland
Geography of Purmerend